Adelia barbinervis, commonly known as teenek, is a species of flowering plant in the family Euphorbiaceae, that is native to southern Mexico and northern Central America. The Huastec Maya cultivated the plant as a famine food, cooking the shoots and tender leaves as greens.  It is common in milpa regrowth ecosystems.

References

Adelieae
Flora of Central America
Flora of Mexico